The 2007 Women's Pan-American Volleyball Cup was the sixth edition of the annual women's volleyball tournament, played by twelve countries from June 19 to June 30, 2007 in Colima, Mexico. The intercontinental event served as a qualifier for the 2008 FIVB World Grand Prix in the Yokohama Arena in  Yokohama, Japan. The winner of each pool automatically advanced to the semi-finals and the teams placed in second and third met in crossed matches in the quarterfinals round.

Competing Nations

Squads

Preliminary round

Group A

June 21

June 22

June 23

June 24

June 25

Group B

June 21

June 22

June 23

June 24

June 25

Final round

Quarterfinals
Wednesday June 27, 2007

Semi-finals
Friday June 29, 2007

Finals
Wednesday June 27, 2007 — Eleventh Place Match

Wednesday June 27, 2007 — Ninth Place Match

Thursday June 28, 2007 — Seventh Place Match

Thursday June 28, 2007 — Fifth Place Match

Saturday June 30, 2007 — Bronze Medal Match

Saturday June 30, 2007 — Gold Medal Match

Final ranking

Cuba, Brazil, Dominican Republic and the United States qualified for the 2008 World Grand Prix

Awards

Most Valuable Player
  Nancy Carrillo

Best Attacker
  Nancy Carrillo

Best Scorer
  Bethania de la Cruz

Best Defender
  Camila Brait

Best Setter
  Larissa Cundy
Best Server
  Nancy Carrillo

Best Receiver
  Vanessa Palacios

Best Libero
  Carmen Rosa Caso

Best Blocker
  Sherline Tasha Holness

References
 Results

Women's Pan-American Volleyball Cup
Pan-American Volleyball Cup
V
Volleyball
2007 in Mexican women's sports